Châteauroux station (French: Gare de Châteauroux) is a railway station serving the commune of Châteauroux in the Indre department of central France. It is situated on the Orléans–Montauban railway, between the communes Vierzon and Limoges.

Services

The station is served by Intercités (long distance) services to Paris and Toulouse, and by regional services (TER Centre-Val de Loire) to Vierzon and Limoges.

References

Railway stations in Indre
Railway stations in France opened in 1847
Buildings and structures completed in 1852
19th-century architecture in France